Life! is a studio album by American country singer-songwriter Bill Anderson. It was released on March 4, 2014 via TWI Records. It was Anderson's 43rd studio release and contained a total of ten tracks. The project was Anderson's first studio album in four years and one of several he issued on his own record label.

Background and content
Anderson co-produced the project with his longtime musical collaborator, Rex Schnelle. Life! was a collection of songs Anderson recorded based on the human experience. "Life! is a collection of songs that I feel are truly reflective of the human condition in virtually all of its intricacies, therefore the title. The songs are everything from humorous on the one end to staunchly patriotic on the other," he explained in a 2014 interview. A total of ten tracks are included on the project, all of which were co-written by Anderson. According to Anderson, the songs were a combination of story songs, comedy songs and patriotic songs.

The final album track, "Old Army Hat", was a story song based on a true story about his friend and his father. He explained the writing process with composing the song. "Walt Aldridge is my co-writer on the song and he saw the beauty and the value of the story and he really helped me organize my thoughts and get it all down on paper," he said. Other songs on the album were composed with other music artists, including Jamey Johnson, Brad Paisley and Jon Randall. Other artists such as Vince Gill and Willie Nelson are featured singing on the album.

Release and reception

Life! was released on March 4, 2014 in conjunction with his own label (TWI) and Red River Entertainment. It was offered as a both a compact disc and a music download. The album did not chart on any publication at the time of its release, including Billboard. The track, "Old Army Hat", was later filmed with a music video in 2014. Life! received a positive reception from Steve Leggett of Allmusic. In his review, Leggett highlighted Anderson's songwriting ability and the numerous artists he wrote material for. He concluded with commenting on the album's release. "Anderson has recorded sparingly in the 21st century, so this set, Life!, comes as a welcome sight for his many fans," he stated.

Track listing

Personnel
All credits are adapted from the liner notes of Life! and Allmusic.

Musical personnel
 Bill Anderson – lead vocals
 John Anderson – featured artist
 Eddie Bayers – drums
 Gloria Ceravantes – background vocals
 Dailey & Vincent – featured artist
 Glen Duncan – fiddle
 Rick Florian – choir
 Vince Gill – featured artist
 The Great American Choir – featured artist
 Steven Herrman – trumpet
 Mike Johnson – dobro, steel guitar
 Brandon McGuinness – choir
 Willie Nelson – featured artist
 T. Justin Schneider – bass
 Rex Schnelle – acoustic guitar, banjo, choir, electric guitar, hammond b3, mandolin, piano
 Harry Stinson – drums

Technical personnel
 Bill Anderson – liner notes, producer
 Buddy Cannon – vocal producer
 Paul Cookson – percussion
 Josh D'Aubin – photography
 Dailey & Vincent – vocal producer
 Adam Engelhart – engineering
 Vince Gill – vocal producer
 Betty Hofer – publicity
 Nick Meinema – booking
 Jim Palmieri – assistant
 Kim Russell – design
 Rex Schnelle – arrangement, mixing, sampled strings, producer
 Lee Williard – design direction, management
 Hank Williams – mastering

Release history

References

2014 albums
Albums produced by Bill Anderson (singer)
Bill Anderson (singer) albums